Carlo Paalam (born July 16, 1998) is a Filipino amateur boxer. He made his Olympic debut and won silver medal in the flyweight division at the 2020 Summer Olympics in Tokyo, Japan.

He is also a gold medalist in 30th SEA Games light flyweight division.

Early life
Paalam was born on July 16, 1998, in Talakag, Bukidnon. He spent some time of his childhood in Balingoan, Misamis Oriental. His mother left his father after a failed marriage when Carlo was just six years old. After the estrangement, Carlo Paalam, his father and siblings left Balingoan for Cagayan de Oro for better opportunities. Paalam then worked as a scavenger at a landfill in the city. His neighbor encouraged him to join a local tournament known as "Boxing at the Park" after seeing him in a backyard boxing match. He won his first boxing match at age 7 and used his winnings to buy rice for his family.

Career 
He was scouted by local officials by Zedrick Ramos in 2009 after figuring in the Boxing at the Park tournament and was placed under Cagayan de Oro's boxing training program. Paalam then joined the Philippine national team in 2013 and started competing for international level. He took home bronze medals both at the AIBA Youth Asian and World Championships in 2016, and at the Asian Games in 2018. He took part in the 2017 Southeast Asian Games in Malaysia, but did not medal.

He bagged gold medals in the ASTANA/President's Cup in Kazakhstan in 2017, 10th AIBA International Boxing Tournament, and 1st Thailand International Boxing Tournament in 2018.

In 2019, he took home his first Southeast Asian Games gold medal at the 2019 Southeast Asian Games which was hosted at home in the Philippines.

He made his debut at the 2020 Summer Olympics in Tokyo in July 2021 after qualifying through the IOC-BTF standings “by virtue of their highest standings in their respective weight categories (in the Olympic qualifying rankings)”, after the remaining qualifying tournaments at that time were cancelled due to the COVID-19 pandemic. He pulled a victory by a split decision against Irish flyweight boxer Brendan Irvine and advanced to the Round 16 Quarterfinals. He then won by a Unanimous Decision against World Championship Silver and bronze medalist Mohamed Flissi of Algeria. He then pulled an upset victory against reigning Olympic gold medalist Shakhobidin Zoirov of Uzbekistan by a 4–1 split decision as the fight was halted due to both fighters having cuts and injuries while fighting. Paalam advances to the semifinals against Ryomei Tanaka of Japan. Paalam would defeat Tanaka by a unanimous decision (5–0) to advance to the gold medal match against British boxer Galal Yafai. Paalam fought Yafai in the finals of the men's flyweight event but lost to a 4–1 split decision. He became the fourth medalist to bring home an olympic medal for the Philippines at the 2020 Summer Olympics in Tokyo as he brings home a silver medal in the men's flyweight boxing event.

In popular media 
Paalam's life leading to his silver medal win in the 2020 Summer Olympics was dramatized in an episode of Maalaala Mo Kaya, a drama anthology series, aired on January 8, 2022. He was portrayed by CJ Navato.

References 

1998 births
Living people
Filipino male boxers
Filipino sportspeople
People from Bukidnon
People from Misamis Oriental
Asian Games bronze medalists for the Philippines
Boxers at the 2018 Asian Games
Asian Games medalists in boxing
Medalists at the 2018 Asian Games
Olympic boxers of the Philippines
Boxers at the 2020 Summer Olympics
Boxers from Misamis Oriental
Southeast Asian Games gold medalists for the Philippines
Southeast Asian Games competitors for the Philippines
Sportspeople from Bukidnon
Medalists at the 2020 Summer Olympics
Olympic silver medalists for the Philippines
Olympic medalists in boxing